Laura Cornaro (died 1739) was the Dogaressa of Venice by marriage to the Doge Giovanni II Cornaro (r. 1709-1722).

Laura Cornaro was born to Nicolo Cornaro and married her cousin Giovanni II Cornaro in 1667. As dogaressa, Laura Cornaro was described as strict and prudish and in opposition to the greater personal freedom which became more evident in the Venetian aristocracy in the 18th-century: "at all events the fast life of the nobles and their ladies had no charms for her, and she set her face resolutely against the extravagances and indecencies around her".

As a widow, Cornaro became a postulant of the Order of the Augustinians of SS. Gervaso e Protasio.

References 

 Staley, Edgcumbe:   The dogaressas of Venice : The wives of the doges, London : T. W. Laurie, 1910

18th-century Venetian people
Dogaressas of Venice
Laura
1739 deaths
Year of birth missing 
18th-century Venetian women